The "Dancing Baby", also called "Baby Cha-Cha" or "the Oogachacka Baby", is a 3D-rendered animation of a baby performing a cha-cha type dance. It quickly became a media phenomenon in the United States and one of the first viral videos in the mid-late 1990s.

Origin 
Michael Girard, who has worked on Rugrats and The Simpsons, travelled from Holland, Netherlands, to California, United States, in 1993 with his wife Susan Amkraut. There, the couple started the company Unreal Pictures Inc. and the team began the "Biped" animation project by developing sample 3D animated files. The samples would be released in Character Studio, a plug-in for the Autodesk 3ds Max application (known as "3D Studio Max" at the time) from a division of Autodesk, Kinetix.

Robert Lurye, who was animating at Rhythm and Hues Studios, was hired by the company and was told to make more samples. Lurye started changing the choreography of a dancing adult skeleton that had been made by the team (the "chacha.bip" file). He added more dance moves, such as making it "play air guitar for a second and bend over and shake its shoulders." For the visuals, Unreal Pictures Inc. had multiple renderings of creatures that could be animated, including an alien, a dinosaur and a baby. The baby, made by modeler Tony Morrill, had been bought from a Viewpoint DataLabs listing. Team member John Chadwick, by using the Physique software, made the baby model perform the skeleton's dance. He stated that it was his idea to load the dancing animation on the baby. Vulture, a pop culture website owned by New York magazine, reports that the animation was also developed by Paul Bloemink, John Hutchinson and Adam Felt.

The result was a file with the name "sk_baby.max". Kinetix exhibited a demo of the Dancing Baby in the 1995 SIGGRAPH computer graphics conference. Character Studio was released in August 1996. According to The New York Times, Girard had discarded the Dancing Baby, opining it was "disturbing" for its realistic nature, in contrast to Disney animations at the time.

Spread 

LucasArts animator and Autodesk customer Ron Lussier recovered the Dancing Baby by recombining the chacha.bip file with the baby model (which was commercially available), made some minor changes and posted it on a CompuServe Internet forum as an .avi format. He also reportedly sent the Dancing Baby to his colleagues by e-mail. Although Girard credits Lussier as being responsible for the meme's spread, news website Vox reports that the meme became viral after it was converted and posted as an animated GIF by developer John Woodell.

Users and animators were able to render their own video clips of the 'original' animated dancing baby (sk_baby.max) and circulate these via the Compuserve (Internet) forums, World Wide Web (commercial and private websites), and in print ads and unrestricted e-mail. Such activity proliferated most significantly from mainstream (Windows users) royalty-free access to and user renderings of the 3D dancing baby source file for use on the Internet and in broadcast television via several news editorials, advertisements, and even comic programming in local, national (U.S.), and various international markets. Woodell's animated GIF then proliferated to numerous other websites, and later proceeded to show up in a broad array of mainstream media, including television dramas (e.g., Ally McBeal), commercial advertisements, and music videos between 1997 and 1998.

Modifications 
Variations to the original animation were later produced by numerous animators by modifying the sk_baby.max sample file's animation or the baby model itself, including a "drunken baby", a "rasta baby", a "samurai baby", and others.  However, none of these became as popular on the Internet as the original file, and most popular uses of Dancing Baby are virtually unchanged from the original character mesh and animation.

Legacy 
In February 2020, Twitter user @JArmstrongArty not only rediscovered the original Dancing Baby file, but also converted the original animation into high definition.

In June 2022, the original creator Team Michael Girard, Robert Lurye and John Chadwick teamed up with Viennese design boutique HFA-Studio to release a digitally restored, high definition version of the Original Dancing Baby as non-fungible-token. To set the original creation in perspective they invited contemporary 3D artists and animators like Chris Torres (creator of the famous "Nyan Cat"), Serwah Attafuah or Kid Eight to "remix" the dancing baby. The project appeared on various media outlets like CNN and gained a lot of attraction in the crypto scene.

Appearances in mainstream media 
The Dancing Baby animation spread quickly on popular web forums, individual websites, international e-mail, demo videos, commercials, and eventually mainstream television. Awareness of the baby most significantly increased when it was featured on CBS, CNN, and Fox's comic drama series Ally McBeal. The animation was shown on several episodes of Ally McBeal as a recurring hallucination, suggesting a metaphor for the ticking of Ally's biological clock. On the show, it was accompanied by Blue Swede's cover of the B. J. Thomas song "Hooked on a Feeling". Various commercial advertisements presented the Dancing Baby animation to international markets continuing the mainstream media attention. This particular manifestation of the video, bound to the song, is widely distributed and referred to as the "Ugachaka Baby" (or "Oogachaka Baby").

More examples of the Dancing Baby used in mainstream media are below.

Television, media, music and film
The Dancing Baby made constant appearances in trade shows, worldwide marketing media, and in mainstream media such as television, music videos, and later in film too:
 Crash Designs Incorporated, a 1990s dot-com company, founded by father and son Jeffrey Ambrose and Michael Ambrose, was the first to sell Dancing Baby merchandise, including T-shirts, ties, boxers, and mouse pads through its e-commerce website.
 In 1996, the original Character Studio dancing baby animation appeared in major trade show demo reels, including NAB, IBC, Game Developer Conference (GDC), E3, and others.
 In 1996, the sequence appeared in Studio !K7 release 'X-Mix Electro Boogie', as soundtrack for the track 'Demented Spirit' by The Octagon Man.
 In 1996 and 1997, the dancing baby animation appeared on various local television broadcasts, including news and tech editorials, and CBS syndicated stations.
 The Dancing Baby's first appearance on Ally McBeal was in season one episode 12, "Cro-Magnon", airing on January 5, 1998.
 At the height of the Ally McBeal series, a dance group called Trubble released a song called "Dancing Baby (Ooga-Chaka)", which charted well in Australia in late 1998/early 1999 and reached No. 21 on the UK chart.
 The Dancing Baby appeared on an episode of Unhappily Ever After, with Dennis Franz as the baby.
 It was parodied in the opening of The House that Dick Built, episode 15 from the 4th season of 3rd Rock from the Sun, with Harry Solomon (French Stewart) as the baby.
 In the parody wrestling series Celebrity Deathmatch, during a match between Lucy Lawless and Calista Flockhart (the actress who played Ally McBeal), the dancing baby suddenly appears in the ring with his back turned to the camera. After a moment of dancing, he turns around and is shown to be Dennis Franz in nothing but a diaper; referee Mills Lane shouts at him, "I told you I didn't want you in my ring, Dennis Franz!", to which an annoyed Franz leaves not before replying back, "Alright, tough guy."
 Blockbuster Video commercial, baby dances to the Rick James hit, "Give It to Me Baby".
 The Dancing Baby is also spoofed in an episode of The Simpsons, "The Computer Wore Menace Shoes", in which Homer visits (and later steals from) a website featuring Jesus dancing with the same moves as the baby.
 In the television series Millennium, the episode "Somehow, Satan Got Behind Me" features a demon who manifests himself in the form of a baby, dancing to the Black Flag song "My War". Writer/director Darin Morgan based the baby on its use in Ally McBeal; he commented, "It's a terrifying thing, that baby. She dances with it, and you go, 'There's something really wrong with this person.'"
 During the song "So Young" on the live concert DVD The Corrs: Live at Lansdowne Road the dancing baby is visible on the screens in the back of the stage.
 In an episode of Chowder, a parody of the dancing baby (looking rather demonic) appears, causing everyone to freak out and scream at the sight of it.
 In the 2002 movie Life or Something Like It, the Dancing Baby appears on the score board at the baseball game.
 The Cincinnati, Ohio classic rock station WEBN featured the dancing baby dancing to the song "You Shook Me All Night Long" by AC/DC on a television commercial for the station.
 In the episode of Family Guy called "McStroke", Stewie Griffin and Brian Griffin bet on whether or not Stewie could become the coolest kid in high school in a week. He did, so Brian had to email all of his friends the Dancing Baby video.
 In 2010, the Dancing Baby appeared on an episode of SuperNews!.
 In 2015, it made an appearance in a Delta safety video.
 The Dancing Baby makes several appearances in the Tiger Award-winning Peruvian film Videophilia (and Other Viral Syndromes).
 The Original Dancing Baby project appears in a feature CNN article by Jacqui Palumbo (The internet's famous dancing baby from 1996 is getting a new look)

Video games
Several video games have included references to the Dancing Baby.
 In the EA Sports football game FIFA 99, the editor includes an animation of a player doing the Dancing Baby dance.
 The Dancing Baby also makes an appearance in the Xbox and PS2 title Silent Hill 4: The Room.
 An easter egg exists in Quest for Glory V: Dragon Fire where the hero dances in the Dead Parrot Inn, imitating the exact moves of the Dancing Baby.
 In the official trailer for Stalin vs. Martians, Stalin dances around the same as Dancing Baby.
 The Dancing Baby was used in an animation featured at the end of a level in the game RollerTyping. 
 In the computer game Zoo Tycoon, the gorillas will sometimes do the same dance as the dancing baby.
 In a leaked alpha build of Half-Life, the tech demo map contains a model of the Polyrobo, a robot from Robotech, used to test poly limits in the engine will perform an animation that is the baby dance.

More recent appearances 
The Dancing Baby is sometimes referenced as a symbol of 1990s culture, or as part of a tradition dating back to the time of its popularity.
 The baby is a recurring feature on VH1's I Love the 90s series, and it also appeared on Best Week Ever.
 In the Journeyman episode "The Year of the Rabbit", a scene from Ally McBeal with the Dancing Baby appeared anachronistically in a scene set in 1997.
 The ninth episode of the 2016 Netflix series White Rabbit Project briefly features the dancing baby GIF, noting that its 1996 appearance saw a peak in the popularity of GIFs after their introduction in 1987.
 The baby makes an appearance in the 2018 music video 1999 by Charli XCX and Troye Sivan as a homage to popular culture of the 1990s, along with many other references.
 It has also appeared in an Amazing World of Gumball episode titled "The Web", where the dancing baby appears dancing in the background during the song "Hashtag Trending".

See also

 Internet celebrity
 Viral videos
 Lenz v. Universal Music Corp.

References

External links 
 "Dancing Baby cha-chas from the Internet to the networks" - Sci-Tech Story Page, CNN, January 1998
 Internet Dancing Baby site - contains a copy of one of the original dancing baby renderings
 The internet's famous dancing baby from 1996 is getting a new look - Arts Story Page, CNN, June 2022

1990s fads and trends
Fictional children
Viral videos
Cha-cha-cha
Internet memes introduced in the 1990s